Novobabichevo (Yañı Bäpes) is a rural locality (a village) in Starobabichevsky Selsoviet, Karmaskalinsky District, Bashkortostan, Russia. The population was 163 as of 2010. There are 2 streets.

Geography 
Novobabichevo is located 24 km south of Karmaskaly (the district's administrative centre) by road. Starobabichevo is the nearest rural locality.

References 

Rural localities in Karmaskalinsky District